New Cairo Academy  is one of the Egyptian private institutes that includes specialities of  Engineering, Computer Science, Information technology, Commerce and applied arts. It is located in the 5th Settlement, a district of New Cairo, Egypt.

The Academy has applied the Regulations of the Supreme Council of Universities to grant students a bachelor's degree in any of the institute's speciality equivalence institutes to grant a bachelor's degree equivalent to Egyptian public state universities.

Institutes
There are four educational institutes in New Cairo Academy:

Higher Institute of Engineering & Technology
Electric Engineering Department
Civil Engineering Department
Architecture Engineering Department
Electronics and Communications Engineering department

Higher Institute of Computer Science & Information Systems
Computer Science Department
Business Administration Department
Administrative Information Systems Department

Higher Institute of Applied Arts
Announcement Department
Decoration Department
Costume Design Department
Interior Design & Furniture Department
Printing, Publishing and Packaging Department
Sculpture and architectural composition and Restoration Department
Textile printing and dyeing and finishing Department
Photography, Cinema & Television Department

Higher Institute of Administrative Science and Foreign Trade
Business Administration Department
Administrative Information Systems Department

Reputation 
New Cairo Academy is officially recognised as a higher education institution. As such, it has the right to award undergraduate degrees.

References

External links

Schools in Cairo